Daniel Ruimy is a Canadian politician, who represented the riding of Pitt Meadows—Maple Ridge in the House of Commons of Canada from the 2015 federal election until his defeat in the 2019 Canadian federal election. In 2022 He was Elected Mayor of Maple Ridge

Early life
Ruimy was born in Montreal in 1962. He has Jewish ancestry. His parents Andre and Jacqueline Ruimy ran Cantor's Bakery in Côte-des-Neiges and a grocery store at Habitat 67.

After 27 years working for various food and beverage companies, Ruimy settled in Maple Ridge, British Columbia, where he opened a book cafe.

Politics
Ruimy was elected as a Member of Parliament for the riding of Pitt Meadows—Maple Ridge in the 2015 Canadian federal election. After being sworn in as an MP, Ruimy said that his major priorities involved "homelessness, affordable housing, helping struggling seniors, and providing assistance to youth trying to find jobs".

He served as the Chair of the Standing Committee on Industry, Science and Technology and sat on the Standing Committee on Human Resources, Skills and Social Development and the Status of Persons with Disabilities.

Ruimy was elected as mayor of Maple Ridge in 2022.

Electoral record

References

1962 births
Anglophone Quebec people
Businesspeople from British Columbia
Businesspeople from Montreal
Living people
Members of the House of Commons of Canada from British Columbia
Liberal Party of Canada MPs
Jewish Canadian politicians
Mayors of places in British Columbia
People from Maple Ridge, British Columbia
Politicians from Montreal
Canadian restaurateurs
21st-century Canadian politicians